Raymond Albert Patterson, Jr. (January 15, 1922 – August 3, 2011) was general manager of the NBA's Houston Rockets from 1972 to 1990. He was named NBA Executive of the Year in 1977, and his Rockets appeared in the NBA Finals in 1981 and 1986. Among his most notable player acquisitions were Ralph Sampson in 1983 and Hakeem Olajuwon in 1984. He left the Rockets in 1990 with hopes of becoming co-owner of an NHL team in Houston, and was succeeded by his son, Steve. Ray Patterson's NHL dreams never materialized, but he helped found an International Hockey League franchise, the Houston Aeros, in 1994.

During the 1940s, Patterson played professional basketball for the Flint Dow A.C.'s of the NBL.

From 1968 to 1972, Patterson served as president, and part-time GM, for the Milwaukee Bucks. Patterson drafted Lew Alcindor with the first overall pick in the 1969 draft and traded for Oscar Robertson in 1970. Led by the pair, the Bucks won their first NBA championship in 1971. Over his career, Patterson was responsible for the drafting, trading, or signing of nine Naismith Memorial Basketball Hall of Fame players.

Patterson died on August 3, 2011, at age 89.

References

1922 births
2011 deaths
Basketball players from Indiana
Basketball players from Wisconsin
Flint Dow A.C.'s players
Forwards (basketball)
High school basketball coaches in the United States
Houston Aeros (1994–2013)
Houston Rockets general managers
National Basketball Association executives
Sportspeople from Lafayette, Indiana
Wisconsin Badgers men's basketball players
Wisconsin Badgers men's track and field athletes
Wayland Academy, Wisconsin alumni